Uncial 078 (in the Gregory-Aland numbering), ε 15 (Soden), is a Greek uncial manuscript of the New Testament, dated paleographically to the 6th century. It is a palimpsest.

Description 
The codex contains a small parts of the Matthew 17:22-18:3.11-19; 19:5-14; Luke 18:14-25; John 4:52-5:8; 20:17-26 on 6 parchment leaves (27 cm by 20 cm). The text is written in two columns per page, 22 lines per page.

It is a palimpsest, the upper text was written in the 10th century in Georgian language. 

The Greek text of this codex was influenced by the Byzantine text-type. Aland placed it in Category III.

Tischendorf deciphered text of the palimpsest. David C. Parker gave a new reconstruction of the text of the Gospel of John.

Currently it is dated by the INTF to the 6th century.

The codex is located now at the Russian National Library (Suppl. Gr. 13, fol. 1-7) in Saint Petersburg.

See also 
 List of New Testament uncials
 Textual criticism

References

Further reading 

 C. Tischendorf, Monumenta sacra inedita (J.C. Hinrichs, Bibliopola: Leipzig: 1855), pp. XII-XIX, 5-10.
 U. B. Schmid, D. C. Parker, W. J. Elliott, The Gospel according to St. John: The majuscules (Brill 2007), pp. 66-68. [text of the codex in the Gospel of John]

External links 

 Uncial 078 at the Wieland Willker, "Textual Commentary" 

Greek New Testament uncials
6th-century biblical manuscripts
Palimpsests
National Library of Russia collection